South Caicos is the seventh-largest island in the Turks and Caicos archipelago, with a land area of . South Caicos is known for excellent fishing, both deep-sea and bone fishing, and scuba diving. South Caicos was formerly a salt exporter, the island still hosts a network of salt pans as a reminder of the industry. Today, the island's main income is derived from small-scale commercial fishing.

The School for Field Studies, a global nonprofit, accredited by the University of Minnesota-Twin Cities, has established a well-regarded Center for Marine Resource Studies in Cockburn Harbour. The Centre's research focuses on marine ecology and natural resource management.  The island hosts an Annual South Caicos Regatta, a large celebration that features parties, boat races, and other games. Though there is some real estate development, tourism is, currently, virtually nonexistent on South Caicos.

Geography
Bell Sound is at the western side of the island, providing an important fishing site. All islands in the east and south of Caicos Bank belong to this district, except French Cay, which belongs to Providenciales and West Caicos. The larger ones of these islands are Hog Cay, McCartney Cay, Little Ambergris Cay, Big Ambergris Cay, and Long Cay (immediately south of South Caicos). Between South Cacios and the Amgergris Cays are the Six Hill Cays and the Fish Cays. South of the Ambergris Cays are Bush Cay, Pear Cay, Shot Cay, White Cay, South Rock, Whale Breaker, and Swimmer Rock (submerged), and southwest, West Sand Spit (submerged). The cays from Bush Cay to White Cay are the Seal Cays.

History
South Caicos may have been the second island sighted by Christopher Columbus. The original inhabitants of the island were Taíno and Lucayan Indians. In addition to a variety of archaeological treasures, they left behind the names of the islands in the form of the indigenous "Turk's head" cactus and the Lucayan term “caya hico” meaning string of islands named Caicos. The Lucayans disappeared roughly 30 years after his arrival, leaving the island sparsely populated and the salt industry booming.

The French and Spanish briefly captured the island in 1706 during which time it became a pirate haven. Until a fungus outbreak killed them off, sea-sponge farming briefly flourished on the island during the 1930s. The United States built an anti-submarine base on South Caicos in 1944, along with the first airstrip in the archipelago. During the 1950s a Canadian businessman attempted to start a conch shell export business on the island. In 1959 the U.S. returned to South Caicos when the Coast Guard constructed a LORAN (low-frequency radio signal navigation) station on the island. Today the island attracts tourists drawn to its unspoiled coral reefs.

Population
The population of South Caicos Island was estimated at 1,139 in 2012.

Villages on South Caicos
 Out North
 The Flat
 Highlands

Cockburn Harbour 
Named in 1840 after an official visit by a Governor of the Bahamas – Sir Francis Cockburn – Cockburn Harbour is the largest settlement on South Caicos Island and is home to some 900 year-round residents. Cockburn Harbour is known for having the best natural harbour in the Turks and Caicos Islands.  Until the 1960s it was an important centre of regional trade and a major exporter of salt. Today its main industry is small-scale fishing focused on conch and spiny lobster exports. A variety of historic structures, including the Queen's Parade Grounds, an old Wesleyan Church, the 18th-century Commissioner's House, the old saltworks and the boiling hole that fed them can be found in the town. The abandoned salt pans just outside town have become the home of a number of bird species including large flocks of flamingos.

Education
Marjorie Basden High School is in South Caicos.

Images

References

External links
 South Caicos at TCIMall
 South Caicos - Visit Turks and Caicos Islands

Caicos Islands